Stan Brown (8 November 1921 – 16 September 1994) was an  Australian rules footballer who played with South Melbourne in the Victorian Football League (VFL).

Notes

External links 

1921 births
1994 deaths
Australian rules footballers from Victoria (Australia)
Sydney Swans players